The Center for Electron Nanoscopy (CEN) is a center for electron microscopy at the Technical University of Denmark (DTU). Inaugurated in December 2007, the institute was funded by a donation of DKK100 million from the A.P. Møller and Chastine Mc-Kinney Møller Foundation. DTU CEN houses seven electron microscopes built by FEI Company ranging from a standard scanning electron microscope to two highly specialized Titan transmission electron microscopes. The microscopes are available for use by both in-house and external users.

The center is located at DTU, in the northeastern end of the city of Lyngby. The instruments are housed in a new building designed especially for the microscopes, 314, and the offices are located on the first floor of the neighbouring building, 307.

References

External links

Center for Electron Nanoscopy (DTU CEN)
Homepage of Technical University of Denmark (DTU)

Technical University of Denmark

da:Center for Elektronnanoskopi